Australian Survivor: Brains V Brawn is the eighth season of Australian Survivor on Network 10. This season features contestants divided into two tribes: "Brains" and "Brawn".

Due to the COVID-19 pandemic, this season was filmed domestically in Cloncurry, Queensland. It premiered on 18 July 2021 and concluded on 12 September 2021 with Hayley Leake named the winner over George Mladenov in a 7–2 vote, winning the grand prize of A$500,000 and the title of Sole Survivor.  It is the sixth season to air on Network 10 and is hosted by Jonathan LaPaglia.

Contestants
The 24 contestants are divided into two tribes based on their intellect or strength. The cast includes author Wai Chim, surfer Felicity "Flick" Palmateer, MMA fighter Chelsea Hackett, retired cyclist Baden Cooke and former AFL footballer Gavin Wanganeen.

Notes

Future appearances 
Hayley Leake, George Mladenov, Flick Palmateer, and Simon Mee competed on Australian Survivor: Heroes V Villains, with Leake and Palmateer as heroes and Mladenov and Mee as villains.

Season summary
The 24 contestants were divided into two tribes based on their intellect (Brains) or strength (Brawn). On the Brains tribe, George found himself in the minority early and was the primary target of the majority alliance led by Joey. Just before the swap, George was saved when Hayley flipped on Joey. On the Brawn tribe, Shannon and Simon butted heads early and competed for control as the tribe culled its weak challenge performers.

After a tribe swap, George reconnected with Cara and joined Emmett’s Brawn majority to eliminate the Brains players who had previously betrayed them. On the new Brawn tribe, Simon succeeded in voting out Shannon after Hayley caused the Brawn to turn on each other; however, Simon was then blindsided after revealing he had two hidden immunity idols.

At the merge, George and Cara continued working with the Brawn, led by Emmett and Dani. However, George acted as a double agent, feeding information to the Brains minority as the Brawn sought to eliminate them. He orchestrated several key eliminations, with more advantages gifted to him, including Hayley, who later won her way back into the game in a redemption duel. After Emmett and Dani turned on each other, George and Cara rejoined the Brains to eliminate the remaining Brawn.

Hayley won four individual immunity necklaces down the stretch, including at the final three to eliminate Flick, a huge social threat. She and George faced the jury, where George highlighted his dominant strategic play while Hayley emphasised her all-around strategic, physical and social game. The jury agreed that Hayley had the more well-rounded game and voted in her favour 7-2, awarding her the $500,000 and the title of Sole Survivor.

Notes

Episodes

Voting history
Tribal Phase (Days 1–25)

Individual phase (Day 26–48)

Notes

Reception

Ratings
Ratings data is from OzTAM and represents the viewership from the 5 largest Australian metropolitan centres (Sydney, Melbourne, Brisbane, Perth and Adelaide).
 
While the season was lauded by some,

Notes

References

External links

Australian Survivor seasons
2021 Australian television seasons
Television shows filmed in Australia
Television shows set in Queensland
Television shows set in the Outback